

Adolf Wolf (23 May 1899 – 11 March 1973) was a general in the Luftwaffe during World War II who commanded the 13. Flak Division.   He was a recipient of the Knight's Cross of the Iron Cross.

Awards and decorations

 Knight's Cross of the Iron Cross on 20 June 1940 as Oberstleutnant and commander of I./Flak-Regiment 64 (mot.)

References

Citations

Bibliography

 

1899 births
1973 deaths
Luftwaffe World War II generals
German Army personnel of World War I
German police officers
Recipients of the Gold German Cross
Recipients of the Knight's Cross of the Iron Cross
German prisoners of war in World War II held by the United Kingdom
Military personnel from Braunschweig
Major generals of the Luftwaffe